Tubb Town, also known as Field City, Tibville, or simply Tubbtown, is a ghost town in Weston County, Wyoming, United States.

History
In the late 1880s, the Chicago, Burlington, and Quincy Railroad made its way through Wyoming, inspiring the Cambria Fuel Company miners to found Newcastle, Wyoming along the railroad. In the spring of 1889, Tubb Town was built by DeLoss Dewitt Tubbs, a resident of Custer, South Dakota, further down the expected site of the railroad; at first, it was only a store. Around that time, F. R. Curran set up an open-air bar, and by the time he built his house over it, the town was beginning to boom. The bar was used by workers from the Burlington & Missouri River Railroad. Later, oil drilling went on in the area. The residents of Whoop-Up, Wyoming, a nearby railhead town, moved to Tubb Town, expecting it to become a large city. Tubb Town soon gained a reputation for being a very rough place to live; the initiation was to buy drinks for everyone at the saloons. Calamity Jane also visited the town once.

However, on September 1, 1889, the railroad announced that it would not pass through Tubb Town. Tubbs did not realize that the Lincoln Land Company, a subsidiary of the railroad, had already plotted the towns to be built along the railroad. On September 10, 1889, the first lots in Newcastle were sold, and the exodus from Tubb Town to Newcastle began. One saloon owner set up shop in the back of his wagon and operated for the town's residents while on the move. The town was officially abandoned by November 1, 1889. Today, the former site is empty.

Geography
Tubb Town was located along Salt Creek and the Custer-Belle Fourche Trail, two miles northeast of Newcastle, in Weston County. Its approximate site was the intersection of U.S. routes 16 and 85. Tubb Town was 7.9 miles west of the South Dakota border. There are no remaining buildings. The site is now marked by a memorial commemorating the town's boom and bust.

Notable person
 Peter J. Kinney (1861–1927), owner of two hotels in Newcastle, founder of Newcastle's electricity, and mayor. Lived in Tubb Town and left on September 10, 1889.

References

Unincorporated communities in Wyoming